Albert of Saxony may refer to:
 King Albert of Saxony (1828–1902)
 Albert I, Duke of Saxony (ca. 1175–1260)
 Albert II, Duke of Saxony (ca. 1250–1298)
 Albert III, Duke of Saxony (1443–1500)
 Prince Albert of Saxony, Duke of Teschen (1738–1822)
 Albert, Margrave of Meissen (1934–2012)
 Albert of Saxony (philosopher) (1316–1390)
 Albert of Saxe-Wittenberg (disambiguation)
 Albert of Saxe-Altenburg (1843–1902)
 Albert of Saxe-Coburg and Gotha (1819–1861)
 Prince Albert of Saxony (1875–1900)

de:Albrecht von Sachsen